Aimable Robert Jonckheere (25 May 1920 – 24 September 2005), commonly known by friends and colleagues as "Jonck", was a psychologist and statistician at University College London (UCL). He is probably best known for his work in nonparametric statistics, where he has a test named after him: Jonckheere's trend test.

Early life

Jonckheere was born in Hem, near Lille in France, in a house attached to an observatory. His father was Robert Jonckhèere, a French astronomer known for discovering 3350 double stars. Jonckheere took a first class degree in psychology with statistics in 1949 and a PhD in 1956, both from UCL.

Work
Jonckheere is probably best known for his work in nonparametric statistics, approaches which make fewer assumptions about the theoretical distribution of the data than parametric statistics. In this field he developed what is now known as Jonckheere's trend test, a method which is implemented in SPSS, a statistical package favoured by social scientists, and R, widely used by statisticians. He published little; however, he influenced many people's ideas and work, with traces of conversations and advice throughout UCL and beyond.

Jonckheere visited and left his mark at the International Centre for Genetic Epistemology in Geneva, where Jean Piaget forbade him from leaving unless he could find an equally able replacement. Jonckheere coauthored a book with Piaget and Benoit Mandelbrot on mental development. Other people Jonck worked with or was associated with include J. B. S. Haldane, A. J. Ayer, Cyril Burt, Hans Eysenck, and Ernst Gombrich.

Robert John Audley's (1956) University of London PhD thesis acknowledgement illustrates the kind of support which was common from Jonckheere; Audley writes that "much of the thesis is the result of long periods of almost daily argument with him." The fruits of this collaboration led to the Audley-Jonckheere stochastic model of learning. This also illustrates one of Jonckheere's main loves, applying mathematical analysis to psychological science. But Jonckheere's interests were much broader than mathematics. For example, although he worked at (what is now) the UCL Division of Psychology and Language Sciences, he also gave lectures at the Slade School of Fine Art there, one of the top art schools in the UK. He earned a reputation for devouring books and being able to talk with assurance on a broad range of topics.

References

External links
 UCL web memorial to Jonckheere
 Richard Gregory and Aimable Jonckheere, in conversation. The Hidden Stories of the Mind. A recording of Jonckheere interviewing Richard Gregory
 A. R. Jonckheere Memorial Lecture Series at UCL

French statisticians
French psychologists
Mathematical psychologists
1920 births
2005 deaths
Alumni of University College London
Academics of University College London
People from Nord (French department)
20th-century psychologists
French expatriates in the United Kingdom
Quantitative psychologists